Entisar Tower is a skyscraper to be built as a centrepiece of Dubai Meydan City, in Dubai, United Arab Emirates. It will have 122 floors for various purposes.

See also
Dubai Meydan City
List of tallest buildings in Dubai

References

External links
http://www.entisar.ae/
http://www.emirates247.com/business/uae-companies-in-race-to-build-second-tallest-tower-in-dubai-2015-05-19-1.591122
http://www.wsp-pb.com/de/High-Rise/Our-Projects/Entisar-Tower/

Proposed skyscrapers in Dubai
Skyscraper office buildings in Dubai